Beverly Creek is a stream in the U.S. state of South Dakota.

Beverly Creek has the name of Tom Beverly, a local rancher.

See also
List of rivers of South Dakota

References

Rivers of Meade County, South Dakota
Rivers of Perkins County, South Dakota
Rivers of South Dakota